The Holden UTEster was a one-off concept car produced by Holden, unveiled at the Melbourne Motor Show in 2001. Holden worked in conjunction with Car Tech and Paratus to create the UTEster.

The UTEster was considered to be an evolution of the Holden Ute. The UTEster used the engine out of Holden's other models, the Generation III V8, in conjunction with a six-speed manual gearbox. The UTEster had a unique interior design with a yellow and black theme throughout and an Alpine entertainment system.. The yellow and black theme was continued on the car's exterior with a Marque Yellow base and Jet Black highlights. The unique nineteen-inch wheels were finished in Titan Silver. The decklid was a split fold design, with the front section used for holding the removable top and rear glass panels and the rear section used as a traditional cargo bed.

References

Holden concept vehicles